The Gaudeamus International Composers Award is made by the Gaudeamus Foundation. The prize is awarded yearly, to a young composer at Dutch music concert, Gaudeamus Muziekweek.

The Gaudeamus Foundation had held an annual music week of Dutch compositions since 1947, alternating with an international competition until 1959, from which time they became fully international.

Winners

 1957 Peter Schat (NL)
 1958 Otto Ketting (NL)
 1959 Louis Andriessen (NL)
 1960 Lars Johan Werle (SE)
 1961 Misha Mengelberg (NL), Per Nørgård (DK) and Enrique Raxach (ES/NL)
 1962 Pauline Oliveros (US)
 1963 Arne Mellnäs (SE)
 1964 Ib Nørholm (DK)
 1965 Joep Straesser (NL) and Mario Bertoncini (IT)
 1966 Alfred Janson (NO) and Ton Bruynèl (NL)
 1967 Hans-Joachim Hespos (DE), Costin Miereanu (RO/FR), Maurice Benhamou (FR), Jean-Yves Bosseur (FR) and Tona Scherchen (CH), Ralph Lundsten – Leo Nilson (SWE)
 1968 Vinko Globokar (FR)
 1969 Jos Kunst (NL)
 1970 Jan Vriend (NL)
 1971 John McGuire (US)
 1972 Daniel Lentz (US)
 1973 Maurice Weddington (US)
 1974 Christian Dethleffsen (DE)
 1975 Robert Saxton (UK)
 1976 Fabio Vacchi (IT)
 1977 Şerban Nichifor (RO)
 1978–1983 no prizes awarded
 1984 Mauro Cardi (IT)
 1985 Unsuk Chin (KR)
 1986 Uros Rojko (SI)
 1987 Karen Tanaka (JP)
 1988 Michael Jarrell (CH)
 1989 Richard Barrett (UK)
 1990 Claus-Steffen Mahnkopf (DE) and Paolo Aralla (IT)
 1991 Asbjørn Schaathun (NO)
 1992 Jörg Birkenkötter (DE)
 1993 David del Puerto (ES)
 1994 Richard Ayres (UK)
 1996 Régis Campo (FR)
 1997 Hang Zou (CN)
 1998 Kumiko Omura (JP) and Geoff Hannan (UK)
 1999 Michel van der Aa (NL)
 2000 Yannis Kyriakides (CY/NL)
 2001 Palle Dahlstedt (SE) and Takuya Imahori (JP)
 2002 Valerio Murat (IT)
 2003  (RU)
 2004 Sampo Haapamäki (FI)
 2005 Oscar Bianchi (IT/CH)
 2006 Lefteris Papadimitriou (GR) and Gabriel Paiuk (AR)
 2007 Christopher Trapani (US)
 2008 Huck Hodge (US)
 2009 Ted Hearne (US)
 2010 Marko Nikodijevic (RS/DE)
 2011 Yoshiaki Onishi (JP/US)
 2012 Konstantin Heuer (DE)
 2013 Tobias Klich (Germany)
 2014 Anna Korsun (Ukraine)
 2015  (RU)
 2016 Anthony Vine (US)
 2017 Aart Strootman (NL)
 2018 Sebastian Hilli (FI)
 2019 Kelley Sheehan (US)
 2021 Annika Socolofsky (US)

References

External links

Lists of award winners
Awards established in 1957
Dutch music awards
Composers Award